Sekolah Menengah Atas (SMA) Kolese Gonzaga is a private Catholic secondary school, located in Pejaten Barat, South Jakarta, Jakarta, Indonesia. Established by the Indonesian Province of the Society of Jesus in 1987, the school began as a boys' school and commenced accepting girls in 1990. It was originally named as Kolese Kanisius Unit Selatan  (English: Canisius College, Southern Unit) and got its current name in 1990. Its nicknames are Gonz and GC (Gonzaga College).

History 
The school was built alongside Wacana Bhakti Seminary in Pejaten Barat, South Jakarta, on land owned by the Roman Catholic Archdiocese of Jakarta. Built in 1986–1987, it opened on 3 November 1988.

Mottos 
The school has several mottoes:
 Men and women for others
 , translated as "For the Greater Glory of God"
 Competence, Conscience, Compassion, Commitment, Honesty, and Simplicity (known to students as "4CHS")

Administration
The school is led by a Rector, who oversees the Principal. The Principal has three Vice Principals, one each for Curricular Affairs, General Affairs, and Student Affairs (the last more commonly called "moderator" within the school community). The Rectors, Principals, and Moderators traditionally are ordained Jesuit priests.

In popular culture 
Kolese Gonzaga was one of the settings for the famous Indonesian film Ada Apa dengan Cinta?.

Major school events 
Gonzaga School Meeting (GSM)
Gonzaga Performance Night (GPN)
Gonzaga Science and Art (GSA)
Computer Competition @ Gonzaga (CC@G)

Notable alumni

 Rudi Soedjarwo, Indonesian producer
 Pandji Pragiwaksono, Indonesian stand-up comedian

See also

 Jakarta Canisius College
 Kolese Loyola
 List of Jesuit schools
 List of schools in Indonesia

References 
 

Educational institutions established in 1987
Schools in Jakarta
Jesuit secondary schools in Indonesia
1987 establishments in Indonesia